Address Management System (AMS) is the United States Postal Service master database of deliverable addresses. Address-checking tools using AMS provide address standardization, as well as city/state and ZIP Code lookup features.

Business mailers use the USPS Address Management System database to standardize addresses by correcting errors in street addresses and city names and to return the correct ZIP Codes. City/state lookup services use AMS to provide the city and state corresponding to any given ZIP Code.

AMS is also a general term describing a technological solution for managing street addressing.

References 

United States Postal Service
Postal addresses in the United States